José Artecona (9 August 1932 – 23 February 2016) was a Cuban-born Puerto Rican sports shooter. He competed at the 1984 Summer Olympics and the 1996 Summer Olympics.

References

1932 births
2016 deaths
Puerto Rican male sport shooters
Olympic shooters of Puerto Rico
Shooters at the 1984 Summer Olympics
Shooters at the 1996 Summer Olympics
Sportspeople from Havana
Pan American Games medalists in shooting
Pan American Games bronze medalists for Cuba
Cuban male sport shooters
Shooters at the 1959 Pan American Games
20th-century Puerto Rican people